The 2022 Meitar Open was a professional tennis tournament played on outdoor hard courts. It was the second edition of the tournament which was part of the 2022 ITF Women's World Tennis Tour. It took place in Meitar, Israel between 14 and 20 November 2022.

Champions

Singles

  Mirra Andreeva def.  Rebecca Peterson, 6–1, 6–4

Doubles

  Valentini Grammatikopoulou /  Ekaterina Yashina def.  Anna Kubareva /  Maria Timofeeva, 6–3, 7–5

Singles main draw entrants

Seeds

 1 Rankings are as of 7 November 2022.

Other entrants
The following players received wildcards into the singles main draw:
  Karin Altori
  Mika Dagan Fruchtman
  Shachf Lieberman
  Nicole Nadel

The following players received entry from the qualifying draw:
  Emily Appleton
  Mika Buchnik
  Chiara Girelli
  Nadine Keller
  Lee Pei-chi
  María Fernanda Navarro
  Sebastianna Scilipoti
  Radka Zelníčková

References

External links
 2022 Meitar Open at ITFtennis.com
 Official website

2022 ITF Women's World Tennis Tour
2022 in Israeli sport
November 2022 sports events in Asia